Beth Ellen Jurgeleit (married name Smith; born 24 July 1980) is a New Zealand field hockey goalkeeper, who competed as part of the New Zealand women's national field hockey team (the Black Sticks Women) at the 2004 Summer Olympics and the 2008 Summer Olympics.

References

External links
 
 

1980 births
Living people
New Zealand female field hockey players
Female field hockey goalkeepers
Olympic field hockey players of New Zealand
Field hockey players at the 2004 Summer Olympics
Field hockey players at the 2006 Commonwealth Games
Field hockey players at the 2008 Summer Olympics
Field hockey players at the 2010 Commonwealth Games
Commonwealth Games silver medallists for New Zealand
Commonwealth Games medallists in field hockey
People educated at Wellington Girls' College
21st-century New Zealand women
Medallists at the 2010 Commonwealth Games